The women's 200 metre freestyle event at the 2008 Olympic Games took place on 11–13 August at the Beijing National Aquatics Center in Beijing, China.

Italy's Federica Pellegrini broke a new world record of 1:54.82 to claim a gold medal in the event. Sara Isakovič, who finished behind Pellegrini by 0.15 of a second, cleared a 1:55 barrier to set a new Slovenian record of 1:54.97, and ultimately become the nation's first ever medalist in swimming. China's Pang Jiaying edged out U.S. swimmer Katie Hoff on the final lap to pick up a bronze in 1:55.05. Hoff finished in fourth place in an American record of 1:55.78.

Defending champion Camelia Potec finished outside the medals in fifth place, posting a Romanian record of 1:56.87. Great Britain's Caitlin McClatchey earned a sixth spot in 1:57.65, and was followed by a seventh-place tie between Australia's Bronte Barratt and France's Ophélie-Cyrielle Étienne in a matching time of 1:57.83. For the first time in Olympic history, all eight swimmers went faster than a winning time of 1:58.03, previously set by Potec in Athens four years earlier.

Earlier in the prelims, Pang broke one of the oldest Olympic records in the book, when she clocked at 1:57.37 to lead the fourth heat, slashing 0.28 seconds off the old mark set by East Germany's Heike Friedrich from Seoul in 1988. Two heats later, Pellegrini posted a top-seeded time of 1:55.45 to erase Laure Manaudou's world record, set in 2007.

Records
Prior to this competition, the existing world and Olympic records were as follows.

The following new world and Olympic records were set during this competition.

Results

Heats

Semifinals

Semifinal 1

Semifinal 2

Final

References

External links
Official Olympic Report

Women's freestyle 200 metre
2008 in women's swimming
Women's events at the 2008 Summer Olympics